Smithson E. Wright (1807–1891) was the 16th mayor of Columbus, Ohio.  He was the 15th person to hold the office, and did so for one two-year term.  He was succeeded by Alexander Patton in 1833.

Life 
Smithson E. Wright was born to Joseph and Eleanor (née Evans) Wright in Belmont County, Ohio, in 1807.

On August 27, 1832, he married Matilda Martin.

Wright died on March 2, 1891, in Cincinnati, Ohio.

References

Bibliography

External links
Smithson E. Wright at Political Graveyard

Mayors of Columbus, Ohio
1807 births
1881 deaths
19th-century American politicians